Men of Ideas is a 1978 BBC television series presented by Bryan Magee. There were 15 episodes, in which Magee interviewed noted philosophers.

Overview
The first episode, "Introduction to Philosophy", saw a Magee in discussion with Isaiah Berlin. In subsequent episodes Magee discussed such topics as Marxist philosophy, the Frankfurt School, and modern Existentialism.

During the broadcast run, edited shorter versions of the discussions were published in The Listener magazine. Extensively revised versions of the dialogues within the Men of Ideas series were published in a 1979 book of the same name, now published under the title Talking Philosophy. DVDs of the series are sold to academic institutions with the title Contemporary Philosophy.

Noting that the series "attracted a steady one million viewers per show", The Daily Telegraph hailed the series, and its 1987 'sequel', for achieving "the near-impossible feat of presenting to a mass audience recondite issues of philosophy without compromising intellectual integrity or losing ratings."

Neither this series nor Magee's 1987 series The Great Philosophers are available for purchase by home users—though most of the episodes from both are freely available on YouTube.

Guests
 Isaiah Berlin on "Introduction to Philosophy"
 Charles Taylor on "Karl Marx"
 Herbert Marcuse on "Frankfurt School"
 William Barrett on "Martin Heidegger"
 Anthony Quinton on "Wittgenstein"
 A. J. Ayer on "Logical Positivism"
 Bernard Williams on “Linguistic Philosophy”
 R. M. Hare on "Moral Philosophy"
 Willard Van Orman Quine on "Quine"
 John Searle on "Philosophy of Language"
 Noam Chomsky on "Chomsky"
 Hilary Putnam on "Philosophy of Science"
 Ronald Dworkin on "Political Philosophy"
 Iris Murdoch on "Philosophy and Literature"
 Ernest Gellner on "Philosophy: The Social Context"

See also
 The Great Philosophers, a similar BBC television series presented by Magee in 1987

References

External links
 MP3 files of interviews

1978 British television series debuts
BBC Television shows
1970s British television series
1978 British television series endings
Philosophy television series